Thomas Raber (born 20 November 1972 in Steyr, Upper Austria) is an Austrian composer and producer.

In the 1990s Raber was musician (piano, keyboards, guitar, bass, vocals) in several bands (sloggahouse, climax, K.R.E.W. twitch). He wrote many songs for these groups.

Raber has also worked as a teacher, during which time he created the Musical "Das kleine bunte Tierchen" for youngsters under licence from Mira Lobe – publishing company "Jungbrunnen".

In 2006, Raber toured the churches of Austria with his production "Wienerfelder Messe" (Pop-Mass). Since then, Thomas Raber has become known in Catholic circles. He also was engaged for birthday-mass from Christoph Schönborn and Ludwig Schwarz.

Raber currently works as a composer and producer in Vienna. In 2008 he composed and produced the Pop-Hymn of Linz (european capital of culture 2009) for the singer Yvonne Finsterle.

He has also composed melodies for TV-Magazines (TW1-ORF-Austria, Austria9-TV) and he is the owner of a publishing company, label, recording studio, and the "Hit-Factory".
In 2015 he received his bachelor's degree in musicology at the University of Vienna(among others at Gerhard Kubik).

Now he is also the producer of Gerald Jatzek, Manfred Porsch and Georg Bydlinski.

Discography 

 1996, "tilt" (sloggahouse) composer, musician – RATOM-Edition, Vienna
 2003, "This was Climax" (Thomas Raber) – composer, producer, musician – RATOM-Edition, Vienna
 2004, "Tante Brause und ihre Freunde" (Thomas Raber) – composer, producer, musician – RATOM-Edition, Vienna
 2005, "Das kleine bunte Tierchen" (Thomas Raber) – composer, producer, musician – RATOM-Edition, Vienna
 2006, "Wienerfelder Messe" (Thomas Raber) – composer, producer, musician – RATOM-Edition, Vienna
 2008, "In Linz beginnts net nur" (Yvonne Finsterle) – composer, producer, musician – RATOM-Edition, Vienna
 2010, "Liederfundkiste – Lustige Traditionals" (Thomas Raber) – producer, musician – RATOM-Edition, Vienna
 2010, "One Big World" (One-World-Project: Semra Türel, Daniel Kajmakoski, Daria Kokozej, Christian von dem Borne, Melissa Hosler) – composer, producer, musician – RATOM-Edition, Vienna
 2011, "Liederfundkiste – Jetzt gehen wir's an" (Thomas Raber, Robert Janes, Lisa Nevyjel, Bertram Mayer, Hubert Till, Uly Paya, Bernd Rossner) – composer, producer, musician – RATOM-Edition, Vienna
 2011, "Liederfundkiste – Juchhe, der erste Schnee" (Thomas Raber, Gerald Jatzek, Robert Janes, Lisa Nevyjel, Hubert Till, Uly Paya, Bernd Rossner) – composer, producer, musician – RATOM-Edition, Vienna
 2012, "Liederfundkiste – In Kinderstadt" (Thomas Raber, Gerald Jatzek, Boris Beketic, Lisa Nevyjel, Hubert Till, Uly Paya, Bernd Rossner) – composer, producer, musician – RATOM-Edition, Vienna
 2012, "Liederfundkiste – Eine Schule für Coole" (Thomas Raber, Manfred Porsch, Gerald Jatzek, Günther Glück, Lisa Nevyjel, Hubert Till, Ruth Klicpera, Bernd Rossner) – composer, producer, musician – RATOM-Edition, Vienna
 2013, "Liederfundkiste – Mama, ich lieb' dich so" (Thomas Raber, Georg Bydlinski, Gerald Jatzek, Hubert Till, Ruth Klicpera, Tünde Nemeth) – composer, producer, musician – RATOM-Edition, Vienna
 2013, "Liederfundkiste – Der Holzhacker Amadeus" (Thomas Raber, Christian Hirn, Konrad Bönig, Georg Bydlinski, Gerald Jatzek, Ruth Klicpera, Bernd Rossner, Robert Janes, Tünde Nemeth) – composer, producer, musician – RATOM-Edition, Vienna
 2014, "Liederfundkiste – Meine Fußballwelt" (Thomas Raber, Konrad Bönig, Georg Bydlinski, Bluatschink, Ruth Klicpera, Bernd Rossner, Robert Janes) – composer, producer, musician – RATOM-Edition, Vienna
 2014, "Liederfundkiste – Die Katze Mia" (Thomas Raber, Karin Reinelt, Christian Hirn, Lisa Nevyjel, Tünde Nemeth, Hubert Till, Ruth Klicpera, Bernd Rossner, Robert Janes) – composer, producer, musician – RATOM-Edition, Vienna
 2015, "Liederfundkiste – Die Tante hat 'nen Bauernhof" (Thomas Raber, Konrad Bönig, Bluatschink, Ruth Klicpera, Christian Hirn, Christine Gruber, Hubert Till, Bernd Rossner, Robert Janes) – composer, producer, musician – RATOM-Edition, Vienna
 2015, "Liederfundkiste – Eh net von do" (Thomas Raber, Gerald Jatzek, Ruth Klicpera, Hubert Till, Bernd Rossner, Robert Janes, Tünde Nemeth, Lisa Nevyjel) – composer, producer, musician – RATOM-Edition, Vienna

References 

Austrian Charts

Ultra Top

Austrian Songwriters

External links 
 Thomas Raber(english Site)
 Thomas Raber (german Site)
 In Linz beginnts net nur
 

1972 births
Living people
People from Steyr
Austrian male composers
Austrian composers
Austrian record producers
Austrian songwriters
Male songwriters